Monsignor Patrick Edward O'Connor (8 March 1932 − 3 December 2014) was a Roman Catholic priest who served as the Ecclesiastical Superior of the Roman Catholic Mission Sui Iuris of Tokelau from 1992 to 2011.

Life 
O'Connor was born in Masterton, New Zealand. was educated at the local St Patrick's primary school and St Joseph's [now Chanel] College in Masterton. Then he studied for the priesthood at Holy Cross College in Mosgiel. He was ordained for the Roman Catholic Archdiocese of Wellington in 1957 and served in a number of parishes in the Wellington Archdiocese.

References 

1932 births
People educated at Chanel College, Masterton
Holy Cross College, New Zealand alumni
20th-century New Zealand Roman Catholic priests
21st-century New Zealand Roman Catholic priests
2014 deaths